The Multimedia Group is a media group in Ghana. It was established in 1995 and has six radio stations, six news websites and a satellite television network.

The group has won several local and international awards for its leadership in information communication in Ghana and the world. Its pioneer radio station, Joy FM was adjudged the second best radio station on the African continent by the British Broadcasting Corporation in 2006.

Services 
Multimedia Group was established in 1994 by Ghanaian entrepreneur Kwasi Twum, with the first radio station went on air in 1995 starting with 12 employees. The media group was started in Accra, Ghana.

Radio stations 
Multimedia Group owns six radio stations in the Ashanti Region and Greater Accra Region. The stations are:
Joy FM
Luv FM
Nhyira FM
Asempa FM
Hitz FM
Adom FM

Television stations 
The group operates Multi TV, a satellite television station with several channels.

Affiliations
The group has affiliations with several radio stations in Ghana and thirteen in Europe.

Staff
The group employs about 400 staff with about two thirds being permanent. Four percent of the group's annual turnover is invested in staff capacity development. 

In December 2021, general manager of The Multimedia Group’s Joy Brands (Joy FM, My Joy Online, JoyNews, Hitz FM and Joy Prime) Elvis Kwashie died.

Awards
The group through its media houses has several awards including:
Charted Institute of Marketing Ghana (CIMG) Award for Media Organization of the Year 2008 – Multimedia Group
CIMG Award for Best Morning Show of the Year 2008 – Joy FM
Ghana Journalists Association Programme of the Year - Joy FM's Super Morning Show
CIMG Award for Best Digital Media of the Year 2019 – My Joy Online
CIMG Award for Best New Media Commercial Awards of the Year 2019 – My Joy Online
CIMG Award for Radio Programme of the Year 2019 – Joy FM's Super Morning Show
CIMG Award for Media Organization of the Year 2019 – Multimedia Group

References

Mass media companies of Ghana